Kılıçkaya can refer to:

 Kılıçkaya
 Kılıçkaya Dam
 Kılıçkaya, Aydıntepe
 Kılıçkaya, Çay
 Kılıçkaya, Ceyhan
 Kılıçkaya, Çınar
 Kılıçkaya, Erzincan
 Kılıçkaya, Sivrice